Hoeselt is a municipality located in the Belgian province of Limburg. On January 1, 2018, Hoeselt had a total population of 9,685. The total area is 30.02 km2 which gives a population density of 323 inhabitants per km2.

Situated close to the "Roman" Tongeren, many traces from the Roman empire were found in the fertile soil of Hoeselt. 
In 1066, this village came under the surveillance of Hoei; it was in that time still named Housle (from hus and lo, meaning house by the forest). These forests of Hoeselt were cultivated in the 12th and 13th century.

Later, Hoeselt was part of the Frankish Kingdom; and then its territory fell under the Bishop of Liège.

The old centre of Hoeselt, with its triangular shape, and the motheuvel (motte hill), both show the influence of its Frankish past.

References

External links
 
Official website - Available only in Dutch

Municipalities of Limburg (Belgium)